Yosef "Yossi" Abukasis (born September 10, 1970) is an Israeli former football midfielder and current coach of Beitar Jerusalem.

Career
Abukasis played in the youth team of Hapoel Tel Aviv, and in 1987/1988 season arrived to the first team. In that year Hapoel won the championship and Abukasis signed in the team for the next 5 years. In 1994/1995 season Abukasis played in Bnei Yehuda Tel Aviv. A season after he played in Tzafririm Holon and in the next season he moved to Beitar Jerusalem FC. Abukasis played in Beitar from 1995/1996 until 2000/2001, and in his time Beitar won two championships and the Toto Cup. Abukasis also participated in the 2000 2000 UEFA European Football Championship qualifying with the Israel national football team.

In 2001/2002 season Abukasis came back to his youth team, Hapoel Tel Aviv, and won  the Toto Cup. During 2003/2004 season he played half a year in F.C. Ashdod, but after that he went back to Hapoel Tel Aviv, where he completed his career.

On 14 June 2011, Abukasis was appointed as the manager of Bnei Yehuda.

On 27 September 2012, Abukasis was appointed as the manager of Hapoel Tel Aviv due to former Hapoel manager Nitzan Shirazi’s health.

Honours

As a Player
Israeli Premier League (3):
1987-88, 1996–97, 1997–98
Israel State Cup (2):
2006, 2007
Toto Cup (2):
1997-98, 2001–02
Liga Gimel (1):
2008-09
Liga Bet (1):
2009-10

As a Manager
Israel State Cup (2):
2019, 2020

Individual
Member of the Israeli Football Hall of Fame

References

External links

1970 births
Living people
Israeli footballers
Hapoel Tel Aviv F.C. players
Beitar Jerusalem F.C. players
Bnei Yehuda Tel Aviv F.C. players
F.C. Ashdod players
Hapoel Tzafririm Holon F.C. players
Maccabi Jaffa F.C. players
Israel international footballers
Footballers from Bat Yam
Liga Leumit players
Israeli Premier League players
Association football midfielders
Israeli football managers
Bnei Yehuda Tel Aviv F.C. managers
Hapoel Tel Aviv F.C. managers
Bnei Sakhnin F.C. managers
Hapoel Be'er Sheva F.C. managers
Beitar Jerusalem F.C. managers
Israeli Football Hall of Fame inductees